Kendriya Vidyalaya Cossipore is a school offering both primary and secondary education in Cossipore, Kolkata. It is a Kendriya Vidyalaya, operating under the auspices of the Central Board of Secondary Education. The school opened in 1983. The school is situated near to Dum Dum, 7 km away from Netaji Subhas Chandra Bose International Airport, 12 km away from Howrah Railway Station and 8 km from Sealdah Railway Station.

Infrastructure facilities

Future extensions 
Proposal for construction of 12 additional classrooms had been sent to Headquarters.

References 

Kendriya Vidyalayas
Primary schools in West Bengal
High schools and secondary schools in West Bengal
Educational institutions established in 1983
1983 establishments in West Bengal
Schools in Kolkata